Cărbunele River may refer to:

 Cărbunele, a tributary of the Lotru in Vâlcea County
 Cărbunele Negru River